Ayer Bemban (Currently also known as Air Bemban) is a small village in the north of Kulai District, Johor, Malaysia.

Transportation

Road
The town is accessible by bus from Larkin Sentral (2, 888) in Johor Bahru.

References

Kulai District